Flavobacterium caeni  is a Gram-negative, heterotrophic, non-spore-forming, aerobic and non-motile  bacterium from the genus of Flavobacterium which has been isolated from activated sludge from a sequencing batch reactor.

References

External links
Type strain of Flavobacterium caeni at BacDive -  the Bacterial Diversity Metadatabase

 

caeni
Bacteria described in 2010